, also known as Operation Kamikaze, is a 1953 Japanese epic war film directed by Ishirō Honda. The film dramatizes the start of Japan's military action in World War II, with an emphasis on the role of Isoroku Yamamoto.

Cast
 Denjirō Ōkōchi as Admiral Isoroku Yamamoto
 Hiroshi Nihonyanagi as Commander Furukawa
 Eijirô Yanagi as Admiral Mitsumasa Yonai
 Minoru Takada as Prince Fumimaro Konoe
Masao Shimizu as Commander Kashima
 Ichiro Sugai as Admiral Koshirō Oikawa
 Toshiro Mifune as First Lieutenant Tomonaga
Takashi Shimura as Staff Officer of the Army
Bontaro Miake as Commander of the Task Force
Haruo Nakajima as Pilot in Flaming Zero
Sachio Sakai
Katsumi Tezuka
Shin Otomo

Production

Toho intended Eagle of the Pacific to be an ambitious, Hollywood-style film. The studio used storyboarding to plan the visual effects sequences, a technique they would repeat on Godzilla.

Stock footage was utilized extensively in Eagle of the Pacific; some sources claim that producer Sojiro Motoki secured approval for the film by offering to reuse action sequences from The War at Sea from Hawaii to Malaya. Thus, special effects director Eiji Tsuburaya's return to Toho was not a lavish affair. It is mostly rehashed footage augmented by a few new effects, and he only had a small crew. Many newspaper critics weren't fooled by Toho's trick photography, citing stock footage as evidence.

Reception
Eagle of the Pacific grossed 163 million yen, the third highest total for a Japanese film in 1953.

Release
The film was released on DVD in Japan in 2005.

References

Bibliography

External links
 
 Eagle of the Pacific at Japanesegiants.com

1953 films
World War II aviation films
Japanese black-and-white films
Films directed by Ishirō Honda
Films produced by Tomoyuki Tanaka
Toho films
Cultural depictions of Isoroku Yamamoto
Japanese drama films
1953 drama films
1950s Japanese films